Southern Pacific Transportation Company formed the Oregon and Eureka Railroad in 1903 in an agreement to use logging railroads as part of a line connecting Humboldt County (California) sawmills with the national rail network.  Northwestern Pacific Railroad offered service over the route from 1911 through 1933.  The northern  of the line remained in use as a Hammond Lumber Company logging branch until 1948.

History
John Vance built a sawmill near the Mad River community of Essex, in 1875 with a railroad to transport lumber from the sawmill to Mad River Slough on Humboldt Bay for loading onto ships.  This Humboldt and Mad River Railroad had three locomotives and connected with paddle-wheel steamboats from Eureka, California at Mad River Slough.  Vance constructed a new sawmill in Samoa, California, in 1893; and extended his railroad both north and south to bring logs from Lindsay Creek to the Samoa sawmill.  The railroad was incorporated as the Eureka and Klamath River Railroad in 1896.  Andrew Hammond purchased the railroad and sawmill on 30 August 1900.

The  Oregon and Eureka Railroad formed through Hammond's 1903 agreement with Southern Pacific was equipped with seven locomotives, two  passenger coaches, and 166 freight cars.  The railroad had 212 freight cars by 1905, and was extended in 1906 to carry lumber from the Little River Redwood Company sawmill at Crannell, California.  The Oregon and Eureka was included in the Northwestern Pacific Railroad (NWP) merger on 8 January 1907, and extended to Trinidad, California on 22 June.

Northwestern Pacific trains began operating to Trinidad on 1 July 1911.  Hammond Lumber Company was formed in 1912 using some of the Oregon and Eureka rolling stock on logging branches off the former Oregon and Eureka main line.  Hammond merged with the Little River Redwood Company on 24 February 1931.  Northwestern Pacific ended service to Trinidad on 1 March 1933; and dismantled the line between Korblex and Little River Junction.  The southern end of the line linked the Samoa mill complex to the national rail network for another half century.  NWP sold the line north of Little River Junction back to Hammond Lumber Company.  Hammond extended logging branches northward toward Big Lagoon until a 1945 wildfire destroyed many of the trestles.  The last logging train ran on 23 August 1948.

Route

 Milepost 0 - Samoa
 Milepost 1 - Samoa Yard
 Milepost 1.3 - Carsons
 Milepost 2 - Humboldt Northern Railroad crossing
 Milepost 4 - Manila
 Milepost 6 - Daniels
 Milepost 7.5 - Arcata
 Milepost 8.5 - Normal Junction (to Eureka, California)
 Milepost 9.5 - Janes Creek
 Milepost 11 - Korblex, California
 Milepost 11.5 - Minor Junction
 Milepost 11.9 - McCloskey (water tank)
 Milepost 12 - Englehart
 Milepost 12.5 - Essex (4-stall roundhouse and turntable built in 1898 and dismantled in 1920)
 Milepost 13 - Shingle Mill
 Milepost 14 - Dairy
 Milepost 15 - Thompsons
 Milepost 16 - Carsons No. 2
 Milepost 17 - Fieldbrook
 Milepost 17.5 - Camp 5
 Milepost 20 - Little River Junction (to connection at Camp 9 with Humboldt Northern logging railroad from Samoa) (water tank)
 Milepost 21 - Crannell
 Milepost 22 - Cole Spur
 Milepost 22.5 - Camp 10
 Milepost 23 - Moonstone
 Milepost 24 - Luffenholtz (2-stall roundhouse built in 1904 burned in 1906)
 Milepost 24.5 - Kalstrom's Siding
 Milepost 25 - 25 Junction (with Hammond Lumber Company branches toward Big Lagoon) (water tank)
 Milepost 26 - Dead Man
 Milepost 26.5 - Culbert
 Milepost 27.5 - Trinidad (2-stall roundhouse and turntable built in 1913 and dismantled in 1924)

Oregon and Eureka Locomotives

additional Hammond Lumber Company Locomotives used during NWP operation

Notes

Logging railroads in the United States
Transportation in Humboldt County, California
Eureka, California
Defunct California railroads